The voiced velar nasal, also known as agma, from the Greek word for 'fragment', is a type of consonantal sound used in some spoken languages. It is the sound of ng in English sing as well as n before velar consonants as in English and ink. Both the IPA symbol and the sound are commonly called 'eng' or 'engma'.

As a phoneme, the velar nasal does not occur in many of the indigenous languages of the Americas, languages of the Middle East, Romance languages, or languages of the Caucasus, but it is extremely common in Australian Aboriginal languages and is also common in many languages of Sub-Saharan Africa, East Asia, Southeast Asia and Polynesia. Half of the 469 languages surveyed in  had a velar nasal phoneme; as a further curiosity, many of them limit its occurrence to the syllable coda. In many languages that do not have the velar nasal as a phoneme, it occurs as an allophone of  before velar consonants. This kind of assimilation can even be found in languages with phonemic voiced velar nasals, such as English.

Some languages have the pre-velar nasal, which is articulated slightly more front compared with the place of articulation of the prototypical velar nasal, though not as front as the prototypical palatal nasal - see that article for more information.

Conversely, some languages have the post-velar nasal, which is articulated slightly behind the place of articulation of a prototypical velar nasal, though not as back as the prototypical uvular nasal.

Features

Features of the voiced velar nasal:

Occurrence

See also
 Index of phonetics articles
 Eng (letter)

Notes

References

External links
 

Velar consonants
Nasal consonants
Pulmonic consonants
Voiced consonants